Vahan is a given name. People with the given name Vahan include:

Vahan (Byzantine commander) (died 636), Eastern Roman Byzantine commander of Armenian origin
Vahan Chamlian (1926–2022), American-Armenian businessman and philanthropist
Vahan Gevorgyan (born 1981), Polish Armenian footballer
Vahan Hovhannisyan (born 1956), Armenian politician
Vahan Janjigian, American-Armenian financial strategist and editor (Forbes inc.)
Vahan Kurkjian (1863–1961), Syrian-born Armenian author and historian wrote authored History of Armenia
Vahan Malezian (1871–1966), Armenian writer, poet, translator and social activist
Vahan Mamikonian (440/445–503/510), Armenian nobleman
Vahan Mardirossian (born 1975), Armenian conductor and pianist
Vahan Shirvanian (1925–2013), American Armenian cartoonist
Vahan Tekeyan (1863–1961), pan-Armenian poet and activist
Vahan Terian (1875–1920), Armenian poet
Vahan Totovents (1889-1938), Armenian writer, poet and activist

See also
Vahan (disambiguation)
Gabriel Vahanian (1927-2012), French Protestant Christian theologian 

Armenian masculine given names